Jiangsu Sainty may refer to:
 Jiangsu Sainty International Group, parent company of the football club and the listed company, now an intermediate holding company of 
 Jiangsu F.C., formerly known as Jiangsu Sainty F.C., Chinese football club based in Nanjing
 Jiangsu Sainty (company), Chinese listed clothing company based in Nanjing